East Henderson High School is a public high school in East Flat Rock, North Carolina. The school was built in 1960. As of the 2016–2017 school year the student population was 905 with 64 classroom teachers. East Henderson High is part of the Henderson County Public Schools district. The school serves students in grades nine through twelve. The mascot is an eagle and the colors are green, white and unofficially, black. The school is located at 150 Eagle Pride Drive in East Flat Rock. It is commonly known as "East" by residents in Hendersonville/Flat Rock and surrounding areas.

In popular culture 
School was used as a filming location in the Walt Disney Studios film Heavyweights in 1994.

References

External links 
 c.us District website

Public high schools in North Carolina
Schools in Henderson County, North Carolina
1960 establishments in North Carolina
Educational institutions established in 1960